We Did Not Know the Forest Spirit Made the Flowers Grow is the Black Lips' second LP album, released in 2004. The name is a reference to a line from the Hayao Miyazaki film Princess Mononoke.

Track listing 

 "M.I.A." - 2:24
 "Time of the Scab" - 2:17
 "Dawn of the Age of Tomorrow" - 1:47
 "Nothing At All/100 New Fears" - 3:17
 "Stranger" - 2:15
 "Juvenile" - 1:50
 "Notown Blues" - 2:57
 "Ghetto Cross" - 2:14
 "Jumpin Around" - 1:26
 "Super X-13" - 9:10
 "Hope Jazz" (Bonus track)

References

2004 albums
Black Lips albums